This is a list of bus routes operated by the Washington Metropolitan Area Transit Authority (WMATA), branded as Metrobus.  Many are the descendants of streetcar lines operated by the Capital Transit Company or its predecessors.

Current routes

The list of Metrobus routes has been split by region:
List of Metrobus routes in Washington, D.C.
List of Metrobus routes in Maryland
List of Metrobus routes in Virginia

Numbering
Most Metrobus routes follow the rules below:
 Metrobus routes in Washington, D.C., have either a two digit number (31, 42, 64, etc.) or a letter followed by a number (A2, S2, X8, etc.).
 Metrobus routes in Montgomery County, MD, have a letter followed by a number (C4, Q4, Z6, etc.).
 Metrobus routes in Prince George's County, MD, have a letter followed by two numbers (F12, J12, P12, etc.).
 Metrobus routes in Northern Virginia have one or two numbers followed by a letter (1A, 16C, 29N, etc.).

Odd-numbered routes are typically part-time variants of even-numbered routes. At one time, odd numbered routes were express routes, but that distinction has been abandoned. Most Maryland and Washington, D.C., routes are grouped by their first digit. When this system was laid out in 1936, the following clustering was used:

Divisions

References
 Metrobus timetables, accessed October 2017.

Notes

Routes
Washington D.C.
Bus routes, Washington